Piotr Fedorovich Nazarov (25 December 1921 in Kochki, Novosibirsk Oblast, Soviet Russia – 19 April 1988 in Leningrad, USSR) was a Soviet and Russian painter and art teacher, who lived and worked in Leningrad city, and who is regarded as one of representatives of the Leningrad school of painting.

Biography 
Piotr Fedorovich Nazarov was born on 25 December 1921 in the village of Kochki, Novosibirsk Oblast, Soviet Russia.<ref name="Sergei Ivanov 2007. p.365">Sergei V. Ivanov. Unknown Socialist Realism. The Leningrad School.- Saint Petersburg: NP-Print Edition, 2007. – p.365.</ref>

In 1931 Nazarov's family moved to Krasnoyarsk city, Eastern Siberia. Here he spent his childhood and teenage years. This time impressions influenced in the future on the formation of the young artist and choose the theme for some his paintings.

In autumn 1940, Nazarov was drafted into the Red Army. He was a veteran of World War II, participated in the Great Patriotic War, he fought in the infantry in units of the 5th Army.

After demobilization in 1946, Nazarov came to Leningrad and entered at Tavricheskaya Art School, where he graduated in 1950.

In the same year, Nazarov joined the first course of painting department of the Leningrad Institute of Painting, Sculpture and Architecture named after Ilya Repin. He studied of Piotr Belousov, Mikhail Platunov, Valery Pimenov.

In 1956 Nazarov graduated from Leningrad Institute of Painting, Sculpture and Architecture namen after Ilya Repin in Rudolf Frentz personal Art Studio. His graduation work was a historical painting named "Lenin at the opening of the first power plant in rural Kashino", dedicated to the first steps to implement the plan of industrialization of Soviet Russia (GOELRO plan).

In the years 1957–1970, Nazarov worked as an artist in various organizations in Leningrad, and he also painted to order. Starting in 1957, Nazarov participated in Art Exhibitions. He painted genre and historical paintings, portraits, landscapes, still lifes, sketches from the life. His personal exhibition was in Leningrad in 1981.

For the manner of Nazarov the characteristic variety of techniques, decorative, skilful of plein air painting. The coloring of his work is saturated, painting is based on the relationship of warm and cold tones, and light and shadow contrasts.

Nazarov was a member of the Leningrad Union of Artists since 1970. In years 1970–1988, Nazarov worked as Art Teacher in the Vera Mukhina Art Institute in Leningrad.

Piotr Fedorovich Nazarov died on 19 April 1988 in Leningrad aged sixty-seven. His paintings reside in art museums and private collections in Russia, England, in the U.S., Japan, and other countries.

See also
 Leningrad School of Painting
 List of Russian artists
 List of 20th-century Russian painters
 List of painters of Saint Petersburg Union of Artists
 Saint Petersburg Union of Artists

References

 Bibliography 
 Exhibition of works by Leningrad artists of 1960. Exhibition catalogue. - Leningrad: Khudozhnik RSFSR, 1963. -p. 13.
 Autumn Exhibition of works by Leningrad artists of 1962. Exhibition Catalogue. - Leningrad: : Khudozhnik RSFSR, 1962. - p. 19.
 The Leningrad Fine Arts Exhibition. - Leningrad: Khudozhnik RSFSR, 1964. - p. 35.
 Directory of members of the Leningrad branch of Union of Artists of Russian Federation. - Leningrad: Khudozhnik RSFSR, 1987. - p. 89.
 Sergei V. Ivanov. Unknown Socialist Realism. The Leningrad School. - Saint Petersburg: NP-Print Edition, 2007. – pp. 365, 390, 393, 394, 396–398, 402, 403, 405. , .
 Anniversary Directory graduates of Saint Petersburg State Academic Institute of Painting, Sculpture, and Architecture named after Ilya Repin, Russian Academy of Arts. 1915 - 2005''. - Saint Petersburg: Pervotsvet Publishing House, 2007. P.76.

1921 births
1988 deaths
People from Novosibirsk Oblast
Soviet military personnel of World War II
20th-century Russian painters
Russian male painters
Soviet painters
Leningrad School artists
Members of the Leningrad Union of Artists
Socialist realist artists
Repin Institute of Arts alumni
20th-century Russian male artists